The 1930–31 Sheffield Shield season was the 35th season of the Sheffield Shield, the domestic first-class cricket competition of Australia. Victoria won the championship.

Points system
5 points for a win
3 points for a win on first innings
2 points for a draw
1 point for a loss on first innings

Table

Statistics

Most Runs
Don Bradman 695

Most Wickets
Bert Ironmonger 29

References

Sheffield Shield
Sheffield Shield
Sheffield Shield seasons